The Vicar of Christ is a bestselling 1979 novel by Walter F. Murphy. The novel tells the life story of the fictional Declan Walsh, who at various stages of his life is a Medal of Honor recipient for actions during the Korean War, Chief Justice of the United States, and finally Pope Francis I (Latin: Franciscus Primus).

It uses as a narrative framing device the format of being a transcription of tape recordings of interviews made in preparation for writing a biography of the now-dead 'Papa Francesco'.

The four interviewees are, in order: Master Gunnery Sergeant Giuseppe Michelangelo Guicciardini, Jr., USMC retired, who recounts Walsh’s wartime experiences;  Associate Justice of the Supreme Court C. Bradley Walker, III, who recounts the circumstances leading to Walsh’s appointment, career, and eventual resignation as Chief Justice; Ugo Cardinal Galeotti, who recounts the election of Declan Walsh (at the time a simple monk who had resigned as Chief Justice after the death of his wife) by a bitterly deadlocked conclave and his subsequent career as Papa Francesco; and Walsh’s Papal Press Secretary Robert Twisdale, who recounts the assassination and funeral of Papa Francesco. Each of the four interviews is prefaced with a short quotation from a poem by Zbigniew Herbert.

References

External links
Will Pope Francis Break the Church? This includes a plot summary.

1979 American novels
Works about the United States Marine Corps
Fictional Medal of Honor recipients
Novels set in Washington, D.C.
Novels set in Italy
Novels set during the Korean War
Fictional popes